Petr Pavel (born 1 November 1961) is a Czech politician and former army general who is the president of the Czech Republic since March 2023. He previously served as Chairman of the NATO Military Committee from 2015 to 2018, and as the Chief of the General Staff of the Czech Armed Forces from 2012 to 2015.

Born in Planá to a military family, Pavel enlisted right after graduating from high school in 1983. He served in the Czechoslovak People's Army and joined the Communist Party of Czechoslovakia in 1985. Following the Velvet Revolution in 1989, and the subsequent dissolution of Czechoslovakia, Pavel served in the newly established Czech Army and participated in the evacuation of Karin Base in Croatia, which earned him praise and international recognition. Pavel rose through the ranks of the military to become the Chief of the General Staff of the Czech Armed Forces from 2012 to 2015. He was subsequently selected as Chairman of the NATO Military Committee between 2015 and 2018, becoming the first military officer from the former Eastern Bloc to hold the post. He retired from the military after 44 years and was discharged with honors after his term expired.

In 2021, Pavel announced his presidential bid in the 2023 election. He ran on a platform of closer cooperation with NATO allies, support for Ukraine and greater involvement in the European Union. He embraced a hawkish stance on Russia and China. Pavel won the first round of the election with 35 percent and went on to win the runoff against former Prime Minister Andrej Babiš with 58 percent of the vote, to become the fourth president of the Czech Republic and 12th president since the Czechoslovak declaration of independence in 1918. Pavel was inaugurated on 9 March 2023, succeeding Miloš Zeman. He is the second president with a military background (after Ludvík Svoboda) and the first without political experience.

Early life and education 
Pavel was born on 1 November 1961 in Planá, then part of Czechoslovakia. His father was an intelligence officer who served at the Western Military District command in Tábor from 1973 to 1989. Pavel graduated from the Jan Žižka Military gymnasium in Opava. He continued his studies at the Military University of the Ground Forces in Vyškov, graduating in 1983 and subsequently joining the Czechoslovak Army as a paratrooper, serving as a platoon leader. 

In 1985, after two years mandatory waiting period, Pavel joined the Communist Party of Czechoslovakia, remaining a member until the Velvet Revolution in Czechoslovakia in 1989.

In 1988, Pavel joined the military intelligence service and continued his studies in a course for intelligence officers at the Military Academy in Brno (later united with the University of Defence) from 1988 to 1991. After the Velvet Revolution, he studied at Defense Intelligence College in Bethesda, Staff College in Camberley, Royal College of Defence Studies in London, and graduated from King's College London with a Master's degree in international relations.

Military career

Serving in the United Nations Protection Force 
After graduating, from 1991 to 1993 Pavel worked in the Military Intelligence service of the General Staff of the Czechoslovak Armed Forces.

Pavel served in the 1st Czechoslovak Batallion of the United Nations Protection Force in Bosnia. In January 1993, his unit was sent as part of the evacuation of Karin Base, a French military post under siege by Serbian troops. The French Army was unable to evacuate the base because the local infrastructure and bridge had been destroyed, and the unit from the combined Czech and Slovak Batallion (last Czechoslovak military unit) was sent to conduct the evacuation as they were stationed only 30 kilometres from Karin Base. Pavel went to the base with 29 soldiers and two OT-64 SKOT armoured personnel carriers. During the two-hour journey, his unit faced various obstacles that slowed down the operation, including fallen trees which soldiers had to remove from the road while under mortar fire. When the unit reached Karin Base, two French soldiers were already dead and several others wounded. Eventually, 55 French soldiers were evacuated from the base in armed transporters. 

Pavel was recognized and decorated by both the Czech Republic and France for his conduct of the rescue.

Senior management career 

After the operation in Bosnia, Pavel served in various positions in the Czech Army, including military intelligence and diplomacy. He represented the Czech Republic in several military diplomatic positions in Belgium, the Netherlands, and the United States. 

From 1993 to 1994, Pavel was the deputy military attaché of the Czech Republic in Belgium. From 1999 to 2002, he was the representative at the NATO headquarters in Brunssum. In 2003, he served as the National Military Representative at the United States Central Command at Operation Enduring Freedom headquarters in Tampa. During the U.S. invasion of Iraq in 2003, he served as a liaison officer at the U.S. headquarters in Qatar. During this time, he warned that Iraq might use weapons of mass destruction against invading forces.

Pavel was appointed brigadier general in 2002. From 2002 to 2007, he served as the commander of the specialized forces, the deputy commander of the joint forces and the deputy director of the section of the Ministry of Defence. In the years 2007–2009, he was the military representative of the Czech Republic at the European Union in Brussels, and subsequently in the years 2010–2011 was the representative of the Czech Republic at the Supreme Headquarters Allied Powers Europe in Mons. Pavel became major general in 2010 and lieutenant general in 2012. In 2011, he was a member of the expert commission that wrote the White Book on Defense, evaluating the state and proposing measures to improve the defense of the Czech Republic. 

Pavel served as Deputy Chief of the General Staff of the Armed Forces of the Czech Republic from July 2011 to June 2012. On 1 June 2012, he was promoted to Chief of the General Staff. In this position, he organised cooperation between the army and academics and forums on defence and security issues.

Chair of the NATO Military Committee 
Already a general of the army, Pavel was nominated by the Cabinet of Bohuslav Sobotka as Chair of the NATO Military Committee in July 2014, and elected to this position in Vilnius in September 2014, beating candidates from Italy and Greece. He was the first chair of the organisation from a former Warsaw Pact member. His mandate commenced in 2015. During his chairmanship, Pavel implemented the decisions taken at the 2014 Wales summit, including the Readiness Action Plan. He reestablished dialogue with Russia, disrupted after the annexation of Crimea by the Russian Federation, even though he considered Russia a major threat. 

At the end of his term of office in 2018, Jens Stoltenberg, the secretary general of NATO to whom Pavel was an advisor, commended Pavel for leading the Military Committee with great distinction during a key period in NATO's history. He was awarded the Commander of the Legion of Merit for his work in the Military Committee.

Retirement from the army 

Following his departure from the army in 2018, Pavel became a lecturer and consultant, and participated in the conferences of the Aspen Institute.

Pavel together with diplomat Petr Kolář, entrepreneur František Vrabel and manager Radek Hokovský founded in 2019 the association named Pro bezpečnou budoucnost (For a safe future).

On 6 April 2020, Pavel launched the initiative Spolu silnější (Stronger Together), with the aim of helping people linked with the fight against the COVID-19 pandemic in the Czech Republic, especially crowdfunding financial assistance for volunteers helping in hospitals and creating medical tools. The initiative also aimed to prepare the country for future crises. 

Pavel gathered various experts in the initiative including head of the State Office for Nuclear Safety , businessman Martin Hausenblas, president of the Czech Society of Emergency Medicine and Disaster Medicine Jana Šeblová, and former governor of the Olomouc Region Jan Březina. Pavel started travelling around Czech regions and gathering information about the fight against the epidemic from experts, authorities and institutions. Based on the initiative's findings, Pavel met Prime Minister Andrej Babiš to present him an anti-crisis plan created by the initiative. 

Some political commentators such as Petr Holec and Ondřej Leinert linked the initiative to Pavel's potential presidential bid, noting similarities with Hillary Clinton's slogan during the 2016 United States presidential election.

2023 presidential campaign 

In 2019, leaders of the Civic Democratic Party, KDU-ČSL, TOP 09, Mayors and Independents, and Czech Pirate Party met to discuss potential candidates for the next presidential election. Pavel was reported to be the most discussed candidate at the meeting.

On 29 June 2022, Pavel announced his intention to run in the 2023 Czech presidential election. He said he wanted to win the election so that the Czech Republic would not have to feel embarrassed by its president. Pavel launched his official campaign on 6 September 2022, saying he wanted to "return order and peace to the Czech Republic", running on a pro-Western, pro-European, and anti-populist platform, the views he advocated for throughout his senior military management career. On 4 October 2022, he was one of three candidates endorsed by the Spolu electoral alliance (the Civic Democratic Party, KDU-ČSL, and TOP 09).

The first round was held on 13 and 14 January 2023. Pavel received 1,975,056 votes (35.4%). He finished narrowly ahead of former Czech prime minister Andrej Babiš, with whom he advanced to the second round. Pavel defeated Babiš in the second round, receiving 58.32% of the vote (3,358,926 votes) to Babiš's 41.67%. On the same day, the president of Slovakia Zuzana Čaputová personally congratulated him on his victory in Prague. Pavel succeeded outgoing president Miloš Zeman on 9 March. 

Pavel is planning to make his first foreign trips to Slovakia, Poland and Ukraine to reassure the Czech Republic's international commitments and express support for Ukraine against the 2022 Russian invasion. Polish president Andrzej Duda and Ukrainian president Volodymyr Zelenskyy were also the first foreign leaders he spoke to as president-elect. He also had a telephone conversation with Taiwanese President Tsai Ing-wen in the first days after the election to reaffirm the closer diplomatic relations between the Czech Republic and Taiwan, triggering criticism from China.

Presidency 
Before the inauguration, Pavel gave a number of interviews to world media, including CNN and BBC. He spoke with several world statesmen, including Ukrainian President Volodymyr Zelenskyy, Polish President Andrzej Duda and Taiwanese President Tsai Ing-wen becoming the first elected European head of state to talk to the Taiwanese president on the phone in recent history.

He attended the Munich Security Conference where he met French President Emmanuel Macron and Austrian President Alexander Van der Bellen, among others. He then visited Karlovy Vary Region and Ústí nad Labem Region.

Pavel was inaugurated as president on 9 March 2023. In his inaugural speech, he emphasized dignity, respect and decency, and stated that he would like to participate in the creation of a common vision for the Czech Republic. His first presidential trip led to Slovakia where he met President Zuzana Čaputová, Prime Minister Eduard Heger and Speaker of National Council Boris Kollár.

Political views

Foreign policy 
Pavel holds atlanticist and pro-Western views and advocates active Czech membership in the European Union and NATO.

He supported Ukraine during the 2022 Russian invasion, which he described as a "war against the system of international relations", calling for military and humanitarian aid. He said that the West should have acted more forcefully in response to the invasion. He argued that following the annexation of Crimea by Russia and the control of parts of the Donbas by Russian-backed separatists, the West should have established protected corridors for civilians enforced by the OSCE. Once the invasion began, he initially expressed the view that the Russian army would be able to hold what they had occupied, and Ukraine would not have sufficient resources to push out the Russian military, including Crimea, even with the help of Western countries. In December 2022, he stated that Ukraine could win the war and pointed to the importance of aid to Ukraine for the security of the Czech Republic. In 2023, Pavel reiterated his support for Ukraine joining the NATO alliance after the end of the war.

As Chairman of the NATO Military Committee in 2018, Pavel said of the Turkish invasion of Afrin: "Turkey is a target of terrorism and has the right to defend itself." He said it was necessary not to view the Kurds as a homogeneous group, and that some of them were effectively fighting extremists.

Asked if he would have fought against the West in the event of a war before November 1989, Pavel said that "a soldier defends his country and the people who live in it.... every soldier fights for the people he likes and for whom it is worth sacrificing his life". 

Following accusations that the Czech Republic would be mobilized and directly involved in the war in Ukraine if he won, due to his military past, Pavel stated: 

In 1987, in his biography, Pavel expressed understanding for the invasion of Czechoslovakia by Warsaw Pact troops. He is said to have taken this view at the age of six from his father, Josef Pavel, who was at the time an officer in the Czechoslovak Army and a member of military intelligence. Pavel later apologized for the stance expressed in his biography and condemned the invasion.

Social issues 
Pavel holds progressive views on socio-cultural issues. He supports same-sex marriage and same-sex adoption, and confirmed he would not veto a law permitting recognition of same-sex unions in the Czech Republic. Pavel supports the introduction of euthanasia, and rejects the death penalty.

After his election as Chair of the NATO Military Committee in 2014, Pavel criticised political correctness, arguing that it creates an environment in which those in charge are told only what they want to hear. He said that during his tenure as Chair of the NATO Military Committee he saw many Chiefs of General Staff who were unable to call problems by their right name due to political correctness.

Domestic policy 
During the presidential campaign, Pavel described himself as "right of centre, with a strong social emphasis". In 2019, he argued that rich people should pay higher taxes and supports stronger redistribution of wealth. He has cited Scandinavian countries as an inspiration. He said he voted for the centre-right Spolu alliance in the 2021 Czech legislative election. He discussed political support from Spolu during the early stages of his presidential bid, eventually stating that he did not want to be its nominee, but would welcome its endorsement. Spolu endorsed him in October 2022 together with two other candidates. Pavel said he had voted for Karel Schwarzenberg in both rounds of the 2013 Czech presidential election. In 2018 Czech presidential election, he voted for Pavel Fischer in the first round and Jiří Drahoš in the second.

Personal life 
Pavel speaks Czech, English, French, and Russian. He has two sons with his first wife, Hana; they later divorced. He is married to his second wife, Eva Pavlová, who holds the rank of lieutenant colonel in the Czech Army. Before 2012, Pavel moved to Černouček, where he has lived ever since. Pavel holds a concealed carry license. He is non-religious.

Honours

National honours 

 : Medal for Service to the Fatherland (1988)
 : Medal of Heroism (1995)
 : Medal ribbon For service in the Armed Forces of the Czech Republic 
 : Medal of Armed Forces of the Czech Republic, 1st, 2nd & 3rd Class
 : Cross of Merit of the Minister of Defence of the Czech Republic, 2nd & 3rd Class
 : Medal of the Minister of Defence of the Czech Republic For service abroad, 3rd & 3rd Class
 : Honorary Commemorative Badge For the Service of Peace
 : State Defence Cross of the Minister of Defence of the Czech Republic (2018)

Foreign honours 
 : United Nations 'In The Service Of Peace' Medal – UNPROFOR (1993)
 : Cross for Military Valour with Bronze Star (1995)
 : Officier of the Legion of Honour (2012)
 : Badge of Honour of the Ministry of Defence "Saint George", 1st Class (2017)
 : Grand Cross of the Order of the Crown (2018)
 : Commander of the Legion of Merit (2018)

References

External links

|-

|-

 
1961 births
Living people
People from Planá
Presidents of the Czech Republic
Candidates in the 2023 Czech presidential election
Communist Party of Czechoslovakia politicians
Chiefs of the General Staff (Czech Republic)
Czech generals
NATO officials
Alumni of King's College London
Commanders of the Legion of Merit
Officiers of the Légion d'honneur
Foreign recipients of the Legion of Merit
Recipients of Medal of Heroism (Czech Republic)
Recipients of the Cross for Military Valour
Recipients of the Legion of Honour
20th-century Czech people
21st-century Czech politicians
United Nations Protection Force soldiers